The Panasonic Leica D Summilux Asph 25mm F1.4 is an interchangeable camera lens announced by Panasonic on March 7, 2007.

References
http://www.dpreview.com/products/panasonic/lenses/panasonic_leica_25_1p4/specifications

25mm F1.4
Camera lenses introduced in 2007